Armani George Little (born 5 April 1997) is an English footballer who plays as a midfielder for AFC Wimbledon on loan from  club  Forest Green Rovers.

Early life
Little was born in Portsmouth.

Career

Southampton
Having been with Southampton since the age of 12, Little signed his first professional contract with Southampton on 21 April 2015. He was released by Southampton in the summer of 2018.

Oxford United
On 20 June 2018, Little joined Oxford United on a one-year contract. On 17 August 2018, he joined Woking on a one-month loan. He made his debut for Oxford on 18 December 2018 in a 3–0 EFL Trophy victory at home to Tottenham Hotspur Under-23s. He made his league debut for Oxford on 26 December 2018, coming on as a 71st minute substitute in a 1–0 defeat at home to Southend United, before joining Woking on loan until the end of the season on 4 January 2019. Before his contract expired at Oxford, Little signed a pre-contract agreement with National League club Torquay United.

Torquay United
Little made his debut for Torquay on 3 August 2019, playing the full 90 minutes in a 2–1 home victory against Boreham Wood.

Forest Green Rovers
On 8 June 2022, Little agreed a two-year deal to join newly promoted League One club Forest Green Rovers.

On 12 January 2023, Little joined League Two club AFC Wimbledon on loan until the end of the season.

Career statistics

References

External links
 
 
 

Living people
1997 births
Footballers from Portsmouth
English footballers
England semi-pro international footballers 
Association football midfielders
Southampton F.C. players
Oxford United F.C. players
Woking F.C. players
Torquay United F.C. players
Forest Green Rovers F.C. players
AFC Wimbledon players
English Football League players
National League (English football) players